"Bad News" is a song written by and originally released by John D. Loudermilk, whose version reached #23 on the U.S. Billboard country chart in 1963.

Johnny Cash version 
Johnny Cash recorded this song for his album I Walk the Line out in May 1964.

Released as a single (Columbia 4-43058, with "The Ballad of Ira Hayes" on the opposite side) in June 1964, Cash's version peaked at #8 of the Billboard country chart for two weeks. ("The Ballad of Ira Hayes" was more popular, reaching number 3.)

Analysis

Track listing

Personnel 
 Johnny Cash – vocal, guitar
 Norman Blake – dobro
 Carter Family: Maybelle, Anita,  Helen, June – vocal harmony
 Jack Clement – guitar
 Marshall Grant – bass
 W.S. Holland – drums
 Luther Perkins – electric guitar
 Bill Pursell – piano

Charts

References

External links 
 "Bad News" on the Johnny Cash official website

John D. Loudermilk songs
Johnny Cash songs
1964 songs
1964 singles
Columbia Records singles
Songs written by John D. Loudermilk
American country music songs
Song recordings produced by Don Law